Joseph Stalin, second leader of the Soviet Union, died on 5 March 1953 at his Kuntsevo Dacha at the age of 74, after suffering a stroke. He was given a state funeral in Moscow on 9 March, with four days of national mourning declared. The day of the funeral, hundreds or thousands of citizens present in the area to pay their respects died in a human crush.

Stalin's body was embalmed and interred in Lenin's and Stalin's Mausoleum until 1961, when it was moved to the Kremlin Wall Necropolis. The members of Stalin's inner circle in charge of organizing his funeral were Nikita Khrushchev, Lavrentiy Beria, Georgy Malenkov and Vyacheslav Molotov.

Illness and death 
Stalin's health deteriorated towards the end of World War II. He had atherosclerosis as a result of heavy smoking, a mild stroke around the time of the Victory Parade in May 1945, and a severe heart attack in October 1945.

The last three days of Stalin's life have been described in detail, first in the official Soviet announcements in Pravda, and then in a complete English translation which followed shortly thereafter in the Current Digest of the Soviet Press. Decades later, former senior officer and historian Dmitry Volkogonov described how, on 28 February 1953, Stalin and a small number of his inner circle, consisting of Beria, Khrushchev, Malenkov, Molotov and a few others, gathered together for an evening of entertainment and drinking. The guests dispersed at approximately 4:00 a.m. on 1 March and Stalin retired to his private quarters with strict instructions that he was not to be disturbed until sounds were heard indicating that he had awakened. Time passed and no sounds were heard throughout the day. At approximately 11:00 p.m. on 1 March, his housekeeper cautiously entered his room and found him lying on the floor, wearing his pajama trousers and a shirt. He was unconscious, breathing heavily, incontinent, and unresponsive to attempts to rouse him.

At 7:00 a.m. on 2 March, Beria and a group of medical experts were summoned to examine him. Based on their examination, which revealed blood pressure of 190/110 and right-sided hemiplegia, they concluded that Stalin, who had a known history of uncontrolled hypertension, had sustained a hemorrhagic stroke involving the left middle cerebral artery. Over the next two days, he received a variety of treatments. In an attempt to decrease his blood pressure, which had risen to 210/120, two separate applications of eight leeches each were applied to his neck and face over the next two days. However, his condition continued to deteriorate and he died at 9:50 p.m. on 5 March 1953.

Stalin's body was then taken to an unspecified location and an autopsy performed, after which it was embalmed for public viewing. Attempts to locate and access the original autopsy report had been unsuccessful until the 2010s, but the most important findings were reported in a special bulletin in Pravda on 7 March 1953, as follows:

As summarized above, rather than suggesting a plot by Beria, on whom suspicion fell for his purportedly telling Molotov "I took him out" at one point, and his seemingly willful delay in obtaining medical treatment for Stalin, the physical changes seen during autopsy were consistent with extracranial changes that often occur in stroke victims.

Lavrentiy Beria's son, Sergio Beria, later recounted that after Stalin's death, his mother Nina informed her husband that "Your position now is even more precarious than when Stalin was alive." This turned out to be correct; several months later, in June 1953, Beria was arrested and charged with a variety of crimes but, significantly, none relating to Stalin's death. He was subsequently found guilty of treason, terrorism and counter-revolutionary activity by the Supreme Court of the Soviet Union on 23 December 1953, and executed the same day, shot by General Pavel Batitsky (later Marshal of the Soviet Union).

Funeral service 

On 6 March, the coffin with Stalin's body was put on display at the Hall of Columns in the House of the Unions, remaining there for three days. On 9 March, the body was delivered to Red Square prior to interment in Lenin's Mausoleum (where it would lie in state until 1961). Speeches were delivered by Khrushchev, Malenkov, Molotov, and Beria, after which pallbearers carried the coffin to the mausoleum. As Stalin's body was being interred, a moment of silence was observed nationwide at noon Moscow time. As the bells of the Kremlin tower chimed the hour, sirens and horns wailed nationwide, along with a 21-gun salute fired from within the precincts of the Kremlin. Similar observances were also held in other Eastern Bloc countries including China, Mongolia and North Korea. Immediately after the silence ended, a military band played the Soviet State Anthem, and then a military parade of the Moscow Garrison was held in Stalin's honor. In the public's efforts to pay their respects to Stalin, a number of people were crushed and trampled to death. Khrushchev later provided an estimate that 109 people died in the crowd, although the real number of deaths may have been in the thousands.

Foreign dignitaries in attendance 
According to Ogoniok, the mourners included the following foreign dignitaries (listed alphabetically by last name):
 Bolesław Bierut – Prime Minister of Poland, Secretary General of the Polish United Workers' Party
 Valko Chervenkov – Prime Minister of Bulgaria, General Secretary of the Communist Party of Bulgaria
 Jacques Duclos – Interim General Secretary of the French Communist Party
 Gheorghe Gheorghiu-Dej – President of the State Council and Prime Minister of Romania, First Secretary of the Romanian Workers' Party
 Klement Gottwald – President of Czechoslovakia, Chairman of the Communist Party of Czechoslovakia
 Otto Grotewohl – Chairman of the Council of Ministers of the German Democratic Republic
 Dolores Ibárruri – General Secretary of the Communist Party of Spain
 Urho Kekkonen – Prime Minister of Finland
 Spiro Koleka – Vice-Premier of the People's Republic of Albania
 Johann Koplenig – Chairman of the Communist Party of Austria
 Pietro Nenni – Secretary of the Italian Socialist Party
 Harry Pollitt – General Secretary of the Communist Party of Great Britain
 Mátyás Rákosi – General Secretary of the Hungarian Working People's Party
 Max Reimann – Chairman of the West German Communist Party
 Konstantin Rokossovsky – Defence Minister of Poland
 Palmiro Togliatti – General Secretary of the Italian Communist Party
 Yumjaagiin Tsedenbal – Prime Minister of Mongolia
 Walter Ulbricht – First Secretary of the Socialist Unity Party of Germany, Deputy Chairman of the Council of Ministers of the German Democratic Republic
 Zhou Enlai – Premier of the People's Republic of China

Czechoslovak leader Gottwald died shortly after attending Stalin's funeral, on 14 March 1953, after one of his arteries burst.

Other tributes 
Fearing their departure might encourage rivals within the ranks of the Party of Labour of Albania, neither Prime Minister Enver Hoxha nor Deputy Prime Minister Mehmet Shehu risked traveling to Moscow to attend the funeral, with Hoxha instead pledging eternal allegiance to the late Soviet leader.

Guatemalan officials in the government of Jacobo Árbenz eulogized Stalin as a "great statesman and leader ... whose passing is mourned by all progressive men". The Guatemalan Congress paid tribute to Stalin with a "minute of silence".

Church tributes 

After Stalin's death, Patriarch Alexy I composed a personal statement of condolence to the Soviet Council of Ministers:"His death is a heavy grief for our Fatherland and for all the people who inhabit it. The whole Russian Orthodox Church, which will never forget his benevolent attitude to Church needs, feels great sorrow at his death. The bright memory of him will live ineradicably in our hearts. Our Church proclaims eternal memory to him with a special feeling of abiding love."Other orthodox officials, including Nicholas (Yarushevich), attended the funeral and mourned for Stalin.

Gallery

See also 

 Death and state funeral of Vladimir Lenin
 Death and state funeral of Leonid Brezhnev
 The Death of Stalin, a 2017 film directed by Armando Iannucci

References

Sources 
 
 
 

1953 in Moscow
1953 in the Soviet Union
Stalin, Joseph
Funerals by person
State funerals in the Soviet Union
State funerals in Russia
Joseph Stalin